A Legislative Assembly election was held in the Indian state of Punjab on 4 February 2017 to elect the 117 members of the Fifteenth Punjab Legislative Assembly. The counting of votes was done on 11 March 2017. The ruling pre-election coalition was the alliance comprising the political parties Shiromani Akali Dal and Bharatiya Janata Party and led by Chief Minister Parkash Singh Badal. The voter turnout for the Punjab Assembly election was 77.2% The Indian National Congress led by former Chief Minister Captain Amarinder Singh defeated the ruling alliance and the newcomer Aam Aadmi Party.

Background

Electoral process changes
In April 2016, the Election Commission of India revealed about 8 lakh bogus votes of state being cancelled in the past one year and over 7 lakh youngsters who have attained the age of 18 this year were yet to get registered. One constituency in every district will be chosen for trial run of Voter-verified paper audit trail (VVPAT) machines used along with EVMs. Election Commission also decided to set up new polling stations if the number of voters was more than 1200 in rural areas and 1400 in urban areas.

33 constituencies of all district headquarters in Punjab had VVPAT machines installed with EVMs,
 including 22 district headquarters besides 11 high-profile constituencies.

As per the special summary revision of electoral rolls, there are a total of 1.9 crore voters in Punjab as of August 2016.

Political developments
The 2014 general election was held in Punjab for 13 parliamentary constituencies. Shiromani Akali Dal and Aam Aadmi Party won 4 seats each, Congress won 3 while 2 constituencies elected Bharatiya Janata Party candidates. The first-time contesting Aam Aadmi Party won from 34 of the total 117 assembly segments, coming second in 7, third in 73 and fourth in the rest 3 segments. Wherever it trailed the major parties, its vote share was mostly bigger than the margin of victory of the winning candidate, turning forthcoming elections into three-cornered contests.

Shiromani Akali Dal-Bharatiya Janata Party
The previous election, held in 2012, resulted in a majority of seats being won by ruling Shiromani Akali Dal-Bharatiya Janata Party and Parkash Singh Badal became Chief Minister of Punjab.

Aam Aadmi Party
In December 2015, Aam Aadmi Party declared that it would contest the Legislative Assembly elections in 2017. AAP which did not participate in the previous assembly election, had fought 2014 Lok Sabha elections. Their 2014 performance translates to 33 assembly seats out of 117. In the election, the party formed a coalition with the Lok Insaaf Party and gave it five seats. No CM candidate was declared before the elections. According to AAP national convener Arvind Kejriwal, the CM candidate would be selected from Punjab. AAP won 20 seats in the Punjab Assembly in its debut in the 2017 Punjab elections. The performance of AAP was below expectations and 25 candidates of the party lost their deposit amounts.

Indian National Congress
The Congress took part in the elections under the leadership of Amarinder Singh, and the party hired poll strategist Prashant Kishor for campaigning.

Bahujan Samaj Party
BSP is the fourth largest party in Punjab after improving its vote share in 2012 elections started preparations for 2017 early by launching Punjab Bachao Abhiyaan from 1 November 2014. In 2012, the BSP came second from Balachaur Vidhan Sabha seat with 21,943 votes. On 15 March 2016, Mayawati during a mega-rally in Nawanshahr on the birth anniversary of BSP founder Kanshi Ram in Punjab attacked SAD-BJP government as "anti-Dalit" and Arvind Kejriwal as a "baniya" who had "always worked against Dalit and Scheduled Caste people" before he became Delhi CM. Mayawati also declared that the BSP will contest Punjab 2017 elections on its own in all 117 seats. The BSP declared that it will root out the drug menace from the state within a month of coming to power in Punjab. On 9 June 2016, BSP national president Mayawati supported the film on Punjab drug abuse Udta Punjab, saying there is 'nothing wrong' in it. In May 2016, the BSP launched the Pind Pind Chalo, Ghar Ghar Chalo campaign, a door-to-door drive to cover 29 million people across 550,000 households with Punjab Bachao, BSP laao (Save Punjab, elect BSP) as its main slogan as well as the overall theme of the campaign. The BSP formed 65 teams for around 15,000 big and small rallies as well as seminars to be conducted in the state. The party also announced a 10% reservation for the poor upper castes if the BSP government comes to power in Punjab. BSP Punjab unit started social media campaigning and also visited NRIs for support in Vienna, Europe and North America. On 16 May 2016, the Ambedkar Sena Punjab merged with BSP. Gurmel Chander, former president of the SC & BC teachers employees union, joined the BSP on 25 August. On 25 September 2016, the BSP announced a list of nine candidates for 2017 Punjab assembly elections. On 25 September 2016, Avtar Singh Karimpuri was replaced with Rashpal Singh Raju as BSP Punjab state president as the former was declared a Vidhan Sabha candidate from Phillaur. Karimpuri's entry in Phillaur constituency spiced up the political battle in the seat. Karimpuri said that the Punjab Congress does not want an alliance with the BSP, rather its agenda was to wipe out BSP from Punjab in the 2017 assembly elections. New BSP president Rashpal Raju announced a mega rally in Phagwara on 9 October Parinirvana divas of BSP founder Kanshi Ram. At this rally, Avtar Singh Karimpuri and Dr. Megh Raj attacked Shiromani Akali Dal and Congress as anti-Sikh parties.

Election issues
First and foremost issue was drug peddling. There were several election issues like unemployment & lack of skills, farmers' crises, continually failing economy, sifarish (patronage & influence peddling & nepotism), unbridled crime and the role of goons in day-to-day matters of the citizen, road rage & accidents. Atrocities against Dalits and Dalit land issues in Sangrur area, the 1984 anti-Sikh riots and the supply of drugs & addiction to them. Punjabi Non-resident Indians (NRIs) play a major role in elections.

Caste and religion data
As per the 2011 census, 57.69% of the state's population follows Sikhism, making Punjab the only Sikh majority state in India. Hindus form 38.5% of the population, while Muslims, 1.93%; Christians, 1.3%; Buddhists, 0.12%; and Jains, 0.16%. Dalits (Scheduled Castes) constitute 31.94% of the population, the highest percentage amongst all the states. Other Backward Classes (OBCs) like Sainis, Sunar, Kambojs, Tarkhans/Ramgarhias, Gurjars, Kumhars/Prajapatis, Telis, Banjaras, Lohars constitute 31.3% of the population. Jat-Sikhs comprise 21% of the population while other forward castes (general category) - Brahmins, Khatris/Bhapas, Bania, Thakurs/Rajputs constitute around rest. As of 2016, Government of India did not publicly released Socio Economic and Caste Census 2011 caste population data for every single non-SC/ST castes (General castes, OBC/EBCs) in India.

Schedule 
Election Commission of India Announced poll dates on Jan 4, 2017 

Counting of vote in assembly elections in Punjab took place on 11 March. The Punjab state witnessed a tough fight between the major four political parties in the assembly election held on 4 February 2017. The term of the current assembly will end on 18 March 2017.

Districts and constituencies

Distribution of seats

Distribution per district

Distribution per region

Parties and Alliances







Others

Opinion polls

Exit polls
All the exit polls other than India Today Axis My India, wrongly predicted the winner of the election. The exit polls were published on the day of the election in March 2017.

Incidents

Voting Machine malfunction
Several reports of the Electronic Voting Machine malfunctioning was reported from multiple locations in the state. AAP said that it had received more than 406 complaints of EVM malfunction.

Results

Results By region

Results By district

Results by constituency

Government Formation
On March 11, 2017, the results of the Punjab Assembly elections were declared and the Akali-BJP coalition was defeated. Punjab Chief Minister Prakash Singh Badal resigned in next 12 days.

On March 16, 2017, Capt. Amarinder Singh was sworn in as Chief Minister of Punjab, along with nine of his cabinet ministers.

Bypolls 2017-2021

See also
 Politics of Punjab, India
 2022 Punjab Legislative Assembly election
 2019 Indian general election in Punjab
 List of constituencies of Punjab Legislative Assembly
 2017 elections in India

References

External links
Statistical Report on 2012 Punjab Legislative Assembly Elections

2010s in Punjab, India
2017 State Assembly elections in India
State Assembly elections in Punjab, India